Vichy Springs, more fully Napa Vichy Springs is a set of springs in Napa County, California whose water was once bottled and sold in 1898 as Napa Vichy Water.
Vichy Springs is situated south of the Silverado Country Club and Milliken Creek on Montecello Road a few miles northeast of Napa.

Vichy Springs and most of the surrounding lands  had once been part of the Mexican land grant Rancho Yajome.  Most of this watershed was wilderness area to at least 1869, and thereafter this portion of the Milliken Creek watershed, which historically and to present has a robust steelhead run, was developed as pasture and grazing agricultural uses.

The ZIP Code is 94558. The community is inside area code 707.

Other uses of the name
There is a carbonated hot springs named Vichy Springs east of Ukiah, California.

References

Reference bibliography 

Unincorporated communities in California
Unincorporated communities in Napa County, California